The Return of the Scarlet Pimpernel is a 1937 British thriller film directed by Hanns Schwarz and starring Barry K. Barnes, Sophie Stewart, Margaretta Scott and James Mason. It is a sequel to the 1934 film The Scarlet Pimpernel based on the stories by Baroness Emmuska Orczy.

France, 1794. Citizen Chauvelin lays a trap for his long-standing nemesis Sir Percy Blakeney (Barry K. Barnes) by kidnapping his wife (Sophie Stewart).

Plot
In France, The Terror is in full sway under Robespierre, who sends former allies and friends to the guillotine. Jean Tallien and his lover, Theresa Cobarrus, fear that Tallien will be taken in one of these purges before the time is right to bring Robespierre down and end the horror. Although Sir Percy Blakeney, the Scarlet Pimpernel, has returned to England, the League of the Scarlet Pimpernel continues to rescue victims of the Revolution. Robespierre threatens Chauvelin with execution unless he can snare Blakeney and bring him to justice.

Meanwhile, Blakeney has promised his beloved wife, Marguerite, who is expecting their first child, that he will not return to France. Acting as Chauvelin's agent, Cobarrus succeeds in kidnapping Lady Blakeney and brings her to Paris, where she is put on trial and convicted.

Percy and his men rescue Marguerite and De Marre, a former ally of Robespierre. They stop at an inn for supper, and De Marre asks Percy to repeat his famous poem: “They seek him here, They seek him there, Those Frenchies seek him everywhere. Is he in Heaven? Is he in Hell? That demmed elusive Pimpernel!”

Chauvelin interrupts Percy, finishing with the words: “That not-so-elusive Pimpernel!” He entertains the group with his own sequel: “I set a trap. As bait, a belle. His pretty spouse, I grieve to tell. But I never dreamed that I should trap The spouse, the mouse, and the gang as well.” Percy draws pistol and points it at Chauvelin's heart, but Chauvelin's soldiers, who have surrounded the inn, point their muskets through the windows, targeting  Marguerite. Chauvelin agrees to let Marguerite go with Andrew. Percy pulls down the chandelier and he and the gang escape in the dark. Wounded, Andrew comes to the rendezvous with the news that Marguerite is again a prisoner. After long thought, Percy says he is playing his last card.

Robespierre orders Marguerite's execution and warns Chauvelin he is on borrowed time. He gives Chauvelin a list of the next purge of members of the Convention instructions to be sure they are all at the session. After Chauvelin leaves, Robespierre observes to his secretary, de Calmet, that he trusts no one—except de Calmet.

At the League's hiding place, Percy introduces de Calmet as the bravest member of the League. De Calmet brings the list of names and the news that Marguerite is to be executed at noon the next day. “I can save my wife only if I save France,” Percy declares.

In disguise, Percy comes to Tallien and Cobarrus and shows Tallien the list. France is sick of assassination, ready for new leaders. Tallien rushes out to rally supporters; Percy tells Cobarrus that she is Tallien's courage.

Knowing that Robespierre plans to arrest her. Percy comes to her in an officer's uniform, and tells her to write a letter. In the Assembly, Robespierre begins to denounce his 20 targets. Cobarrus's note tells Tallien that she has been arrested. It rouses him to denounce Robespierre as “the new Cromwell”. The Convention responds with cheers.

Percy appears at the prison to rescue Marguerite, supposedly bearing an order from Robespierre. Chauvelin stops them at the gate. As crowds descend on the prison crying “Down with Robespierre”, Percy claims Chauvelin as his prisoner. On the way home to England, where he hopes to give Chauvelin a new perspective, Percy asks what slow, lingering torture they might inflict on him. Marguerite suggests that Percy teach him to play cricket.

Cast
 Barry K. Barnes as Sir Percy Blakeney / The Scarlet Pimpernel
 Sophie Stewart as Marguerite Blakeney
 Margaretta Scott as Theresa Cobarrus
 James Mason as Jean Tallien
 Francis Lister as Chauvelin
 Anthony Bushell as Sir Andrew Ffoulkes
 Patrick Barr as Lord Hastings
 David Tree as Lord Harry Denning
 John Counsell as Sir John Selton
 Henry Oscar as Maximilien Robespierre
 Hugh Miller as De Calmet, Robespierre's Secretary
 Allan Jeayes as Judge of the Tribunal
 O. B. Clarence as De Marre
 George Merritt as the Chief of Police
 Evelyn Roberts as the Prince Regent, (Prince of Wales)
 Ben Williams as Robespierre's Spy (uncredited)

Television broadcast
On May 31, 1938, experimental TV station W2XBS (now WNBC) in New York City telecasted the film, making it the first time that a first-run movie was shown on television. Unfortunately, the staff projectionist played the last reel out of order, ending the film 20 minutes early. After this incident, NBC could not obtain first-run movies for many years.

References

External links 
 
 The Return of the Scarlet Pimpernel at Turner Classic Movies

1937 films
1937 adventure films
1930s historical films
British black-and-white films
British historical films
1930s English-language films
Films based on works by Emma Orczy
Films directed by Hanns Schwarz
Scarlet Pimpernel films
Cultural depictions of George IV
Cultural depictions of Maximilien Robespierre
Films produced by Arnold Pressburger
British thriller films
1930s thriller films
British adventure films
1930s British films